Afsaneh Sara (also Romanized as Āfsāneh Sarā) is a village in Bala Larijan Rural District, Larijan District, Amol County, Mazandaran Province, Iran. At the 2006 census, its population was 189, in 4 families.

References 

Populated places in Amol County